Luís Afonso (also known as Montanha) is a Brazilian clarinetist and bass clarinetist.

Afonso studied clarinet and bass clarinet at the Rotterdam Conservatoire under Walter Boeykens and Henri Bok. He has taught at São Paulo University since 1992. He plays clarinet in the Orquestra Sinfônica Municipal and Orquestra Jazz Sinfônica do Estado de São Paulo. He also plays in a bass clarinet duo called Clarones with the Dutch Henri Bok, as well as in the acclaimed clarinet quintet Sujeito a Guincho.

Discography
with Sujeito a Guincho, Sujeito a Guincho. 1997  - Gravadora Eldorado
with Sujeito a Guincho, Die Klarinetmaschine. 1999  - YB Music
with Duo Clarones, Duo Clarones, 2003 - YB Music

References

Brazilian clarinetists
Living people
21st-century clarinetists
Year of birth missing (living people)